Neil McNulty (born 18 January 1985) is a Scottish actor. He has played the part of Fraser Crozier in the BBC soap opera River City. He also worked for the actors agency Conway van Gelder Grant in London.

Filmography

Film

Television

Stage
Wolves in the Walls – (National Theatre of Scotland)
Love and Money – (National Theatre of Scotland / Royal Conservatoire of Scotland)
The Callanish Stoned – (Theatre Hebrides)
San Diego – (Royal Conservatoire of Scotland)
Beauty and the Beast – (Royal Conservatoire of Scotland)
Last Supper – (Royal Conservatoire of Scotland)
King Lear – (Royal Conservatoire of Scotland)
Medea – (Royal Conservatoire of Scotland)

External links

References

Scottish male television actors
1985 births
Living people
Alumni of the Royal Conservatoire of Scotland
Scottish male film actors
Scottish male stage actors
Male actors from Glasgow
21st-century Scottish male actors